David Hack (born April 22, 1972 in Holland, New York) is a former Canadian Football League offensive lineman who played ten seasons in the CFL for the Hamilton Tiger-Cats. He was named Eastern All-Star five times and was a part of the Grey Cup championship-winning Tiger-Cats in 1999.  He was the head coach of the Niagara Wheatfield Senior High School Falcons Varsity football team from  2009-2010. Hack is currently the athletic director for Orchard Park High School located in Western New York. Hack also helps with the coaching of the school's varsity football team.

External links
Career bio

1972 births
Living people
American players of Canadian football
Canadian football offensive linemen
Hamilton Tiger-Cats players
Maryland Terrapins football players
People from Erie County, New York